"Preachers" is a Ghanaian gospel group. The group is made up of three members, Obed Psych, Emani Beats and Edmund Baidoo. Since 2009, as pacesetters of the urban gospel movement in Ghana, they have toured locally and internationally to preach the word of God through their music. Preachers are notable pioneers of urban gospel/hiphop genre in Ghana and continue to set the pace for the new generation of gospel music.

History

Group formation 
Preachers started as a group of five namely Michelle Majid-Michel, Dennis Enim (lead singer at the time), Obed Nzuh(also known as Obed Psych, now lead singer of the group), Edmund Baidoo and Emmanuel Awuni (also known as Emani Beats). They came together as a group in 2009 to form a gospel rap group which they together named PREACHERS. The name Preachers was derived from the bible verse Mark 16:15 which says "Go ye into the world and Preach the gospel to all creation". They recorded their first mixtape "Very Special" in 2010 with almost all songs produced by record producer and multi-instrumentalist KODA.

Debut album and breakthrough 
Not long in time, Michelle opted out of the group to focus on her education. The remaining four Dennis, Obed Psych, Emani Beats and Edmund continued to work together as a team and blew up with their debut album "Mark 16:15" in 2012. This led to their breakthrough in the music industry as their hit song Go Hard topped local charts, won them the Discovery of the Year award at the 2012 Ghana Gospel Music Awards and Most Wanted Rap Song at the 2013 Christian Community Music Awards. Go Hard's music video also featured on top Christian Hip Hop online magazine Rapzilla.

In 2013, Dennis silently left the group and Preachers released a music video for their song "E Dey Love Me" which brought controversies from the cost and concept of the video to the mysterious absence of Dennis in the video. Preachers have since not officially said a word about his absence. However, Preachers describe themselves today as the interminable trio which concludes that the group is now a trio.

The trio however did not stop there. They continued to grow from strength to strength winning many more local and international awards such as Afro Rap Artist(s) of the Year at the Africa Gospel Music Awards in the United Kingdom. They performed on bigger platforms and put together a formidable group called team bibles up which consists of "die-hard" fans of Preachers. Their Go Hard Tour grew into the Bibles Up Tour which covered more schools and made more impact than ever. They succeeded in winning the hearts of the youth and were always on major youth events.

Bibles Up Foundation 
In 2014, Preachers launched their foundation called the Bibles Up Foundation, which was launched alongside their second album "The Fearless Project"

The Fearless Project 
In August 2014, The Fearless Project, which has been the greatest album of Preachers so far was launched at Holiday Inn Hotel in Accra. The Album title is based on the bible verse 2 Timothy 1:7 "For God has not given us the spirit of fear but of power and of love and of sound mind". The album has been described as a multiple hit album because it won them several local and international awards and nominations. Their song No Juju won "Most Wanted Rap Song of the year at the Christian Community Music Awards 2014" and "Most Popular Song at the Jamming Jesus Festival and Honors 2015", The video for their song "Meyi W'aye" which featured Noble Nketsiah also won "Best International Music Video" at the Gospel Music Awards Italy 2014 and "Video of the Year" at the Jamming Jesus Festival and Honors 2015

International tour
In May 2016, Preachers performed to a multitude in Pretoria, South Africa at the Conquerors Through Christ Ministries auditorium as part of their Bibles Up International Tour. In December 2015, the trio performed at Kenya's popular "Totally Sold Out Concert" at the Kenyatta International Convention Centre in Nairobi and organized a conference dubbed "Ghana Meets Kenya Summit" at the Nairobi Cinema.

Albums, mixtapes and singles 
2022:  Fallin' ft. Dan Ali (single)
2021:  Closet (single)
2020:  Amen (single)
2020:  Control ft. Ma Name Is Aaron (single)
2020:  It's Working (single)
2019: X
 2017: Level Up
 2014: The Fearless Project
 2012: Mark 16:15
 2010: Very Special

Music videos 
2020: Control
2020: Grace Sor 
2017: Above
2016: Together As One
2015: Crazy 
2014: Meyi W'aye ft. Noble Nketsiah
2014: E Dey Love Me
2012: My Days ft. Isaac Ogoe
2012: Go Hard ft. Christ Image

Awards

Concerts and tours 
 2017 Level Up Album Launch 
 2016 Preachers And Buddies Concert 
 2016 Preachers in Pretoria, South Africa
 2016 Ghana Meets Kenya Summit, Nairobi, Kenya
 2015 Crazy Video Premiere Party
 2015 Bibles Up School Tour
 2014 Preachers at 5 Anniversary Concert 
 2014 The Fearless Project Album Launch 
 2013 Bibles Up Tour
 2012 Go Hard Campus Tour

References

External links 
 Preachers' Official Website

Living people
Ghanaian musical groups
Gospel music groups
Year of birth missing (living people)